was a Japanese actor. Uchida appeared in nearly 300 films between 1950 and 1984. He specialized in playing villains and yakuza roles.

He got acquainted with film director Masaki Kobayashi through a friend's introduction. He was able to sign his contract with Shochiku film company with the help of Kobayashi. In 1953, he made his film debut with Kabe Atsukiheya directed by Masaki Kobayashi. His first starring role in the film was League of Gangsters a.k.a. Gang Life directed by Kinji Fukasaku.

He died of myocardial infarction on 15 June 1984 at the age of 60.

Filmography

Films

 Kabe Atsukiheya (1953) as Brother of Yokota
 Somewhere Under The Broad Sky (1954) as Shinkichi
 Fountainhead (1956) as Komine
 Anata Kaimasu (1957) as Newspaper reporter A
 Stakeout (1958) as Yamada
 The Human Condition Road to Eternity (1958) as Hashiya
 Take Aim at the Police Van (1960) as Kuji
 Mutekiga Ore o Yondeiru (1960) as Watanabe
 Killers on Parade (1961)
 League of Gangsters a.k.a. Gang Life (1963) as Kazama
 13 Assassins (1963) as Hanbei Onigashira
 Gang 9, Tokyo Gang versus Hong Kong Gang (1964) as Chan
 Moeyo Ken (1966) as Kennosuke Hichiri
 Heitai Yakuza Ore ni Makasero (1967) as Nakazawa 
 Soshiki Bōryoku (1967) as Teramachi
 Outlaw:Heartless (1968) as Tetsu Aira
 Blackmail Is My Life (1968) as Kitō
 Higashi Shinakai (1969) as Katayama Kunigorō
 Black Rose Mansion (1969) as Kazama
 Daimon Otokode Shinitai (1969) as Fuse
 Japan Organized Crime Boss (1969) as Tsubaki
 Shinsengumi (1969) as Niimi Nishiki
 Stray Cat Rock: Wild Jumbo (1970) as Officer
 Yakuza Deka (1970) as Tetsuji Asai
 Blind Woman's Curse (1970) as Aozora
 A Man′s World (1971) as Tsuyushi Shiraishi
 Kantō Exile (1971) as Yusuke Sakashita
 A Lone Assassin Yakuza Wolf (1972) as Ishiguro
 Kage Gari (1972) as Sunlight
 Kage Gari Hoero Taihō (1972) as Sunlight
 Bohachi Bushido: Code of the Forgotten Eight (1973) as Kurosuki no Kokaku
 Karate Kiba (1973) as Eiji Takami
 The Explosion (1975) as Nishizawa
 The Youth Killer (1976) as Father of Jun
 Bandits vs. Samurai Squadron (1978) as Yomohichi Chiaki
 Ibara no Hyōteki (1980) as Keisuke Kadota
 Onimasa (1982) as Heizō Suenaga

Television drama
 Moeyo Ken (1966) as Hijikata Toshizō
 The Water Margin (1973) as Zhu Wu
 Taiyō ni Hoero! (1974) (ep.90) as Sakata
 Onihei Hankachō (1977) as Ōtaki no Gorozō
 Daitokai Season 3 (1978) (ep.1) as Keizo Miyoshi
 Tantei Monogatari (1979) (ep.15) as Tabata

References

External links
 

Japanese male film actors
20th-century Japanese male actors
1924 births
1984 deaths